Limonius is a genus of click beetles in the family Elateridae. Many of the species formerly placed in this genus have been removed to other genera such as Gambrinus.

Species

 Limonius aeger 
 Limonius agonus  (eastern field wireworm)
 Limonius anceps 
 Limonius aurifer 
 Limonius auripilis 
 Limonius basilaris
 Limonius californicus  (sugarbeet wireworm)
 Limonius canus  (Pacific coast wireworm)
 Limonius consimilis
 Limonius ectypus 
 Limonius impunctus  (Ypresian, Allenby Formation)
 Limonius infuscatus 
 Limonius jonesi 
 Limonius lanei 
 Limonius meridianus 
 Limonius nitidulus 
 Limonius pectoralis 
 Limonius quercinus 
 Limonius subauratus  (Columbia basin wireworm)

References

Further reading

External links

Elateridae
Elateridae genera